Fountain is an unincorporated community in Bay County, Florida, United States. It is part of the Panama City–Lynn Haven–Panama City Beach Metropolitan Statistical Area. The main roads through Fountain are U.S. 231 and State Road 20 and SR 388 .

Via US 231, Dothan, Alabama is 55 mi (89 km) north, and Panama City is 28 mi (45 km) south-southwest.

Unincorporated communities in Bay County, Florida
Unincorporated communities in Florida